Chichester is a local government district in West Sussex, England.  Its council is based in the city of Chichester and the district also covers a large rural area to the north.

History
The district was formed on 1 April 1974, under the Local Government Act 1972, as a merger of the municipal borough (city) of Chichester and the Rural Districts of Midhurst, Petworth and part of the former Chichester Rural District.

Civil parishes
 
There are 67 civil parishes in Chichester District. Apart from the City of Chichester, and the three towns of Midhurst, Selsey and Petworth, most are villages.

Geography
Chichester District occupies the western part of West Sussex, bordering on Hampshire to the west and Surrey to the north. The districts of Arun and Horsham abut to the east; the English Channel to the south. The district is divided by the South Downs escarpment, with the northern part being in the Weald, composed of a mixture of sandstone ridges and low-lying clays known as the Western Weald. To the south the dip slope of the downs falls gently to a flat coastal plain and the sea.   The Western Weald is drained by the River Arun and its tributaries including the rivers Lox, Kird and especially the River Rother and its tributaries the River Lod and the Haslingbourne Stream. On the northern boundary Blackdown is the highest point in Sussex, while further east around Loxwood the land is low and quite flat. The south of the district has many permeable chalk and gravel areas and is drained by two winterbournes, the River Lavant and River Ems, which are usually dry in the summer. The large inlet known as Chichester Harbour and the headland of Selsey Bill are conspicuous features of the coast.

The district, apart from the few main roads, is generally rural in character, as can be seen by the number of villages within it. Apart from the coastal strip there are few main roads, and the erstwhile railways which once served Midhurst have long been closed.

Landmarks
Apart from the geographical landmarks Chichester District contains architectural and cultural places including Chichester Cathedral, Chichester Festival Theatre, The Novium and Pallant House Gallery in the city. Stately homes open to the public include Petworth House and Uppark, both National Trust properties, Goodwood House and Stansted Park. West Dean College is open at certain times of the year. There is horse racing at Goodwood Racecourse, the Goodwood Festival of Speed at Goodwood House, and the Goodwood Revival at Goodwood Motor Racing Circuit. Cowdray House is a ruined Tudor mansion near Midhurst.  Fishbourne Roman Palace lies west of Chichester city centre. To the north of the city are Weald and Downland Open Air Museum and Halnaker Windmill. There are gardens open to the public at Woolbeding and Pound Commons and West Dean College.

Governance

Chichester District Council has 36 councillors, representing 21 wards. Chichester itself has five of those wards (North, South, East, West and Central) whilst the remaining wards comprise groups of villages; see Wards of Chichester District.  Local elections are held every four years and at the May 2011 and 2015 elections, the Conservative party retained control.

In 1999, a leader and cabinet form of governance was introduced. Since then, the composition of the council has been:

Councillors and wards
List of Chichester district councillors by ward:

Economy
West Sussex County Council and Chichester District Council are major employers in Chichester, along with Rolls-Royce Motor Cars assembly plant at nearby Westhampnett. Boatbuilding is an important industry along the coast. Many people from the northern parts of the district commute to work in London, using the A3 road or the railways from Portsmouth to London Waterloo station and Littlehampton to London Victoria station. Fertile soils on the coastal plain are used for arable farming and intensive vegetable production, the latter employing many migrant workers from Eastern Europe. High sunlight levels and a mild climate also make the coastal region suitable for glasshouse growing. A fertile strip of land on the north side of the River Rother is also used for vegetable growing, but most of the area north of the Downs is of low agricultural value and there are large areas of forest and pasture, interspersed with arable cropping.

Football clubs
Bosham F.C.
Chichester City F.C.
Midhurst & Easebourne F.C.
Selsey F.C.

See also 
 Chichester District Council elections

References

 
Districts of England established in 1974
Non-metropolitan districts of West Sussex